Al-Faiha is an urban area located   in Al Asimah Governorate in Kuwait.

Al Faiha is a residential area located 1.6 km from Kuwait City between the second and third ring roads. The Al Turiki Museum is in Al Faiha. It is divided into 9 blocks. Block 5 is the central block which is home to the biggest supermarket in Faiha, the police station, gas station and many other stuff. Faiha was founded in 1953.

References

Suburbs of Kuwait City

Populated places in Kuwait